J'aime ta grand-mère is the fourth studio album by Québécois Pop rock band Les Trois Accords released October 23, 2012.

Track listing 
 "Personne préférée" - 3:29
 "Les amoureux qui s'aiment" - 3:31
 "J'aime ta grand-mère" - 3:53
 "Bamboula" - 3:14
 "Sur le bord du lac" - 4:03
 "Exercice" - 3:02
 "Son visage était parfait" - 2:39
 "C'était magique (Nuit de la poésie )" - 3:30
 "Je me touche dans le parc" - 3:13
 "Retour à l'institut" - 5:05

References 

2012 albums
Les Trois Accords albums